This is a list of listed buildings in the parish of Currie in Edinburgh, Scotland.

List 

|}

Key

See also 
 List of listed buildings in Edinburgh

Notes

References
 All entries, addresses and coordinates are based on data from Historic Scotland. This data falls under the Open Government Licence

Currie